Haltidytes is a genus of gastrotrichs belonging to the family Dasydytidae.

The species of this genus are found in Europe and Southern America.

Species:

Haltidytes crassus 
Haltidytes festinans 
Haltidytes ooeides 
Haltidytes saltitans 
Haltidytes squamosus

References

Gastrotricha